Daedalea circularis is a species of mushroom in the order Polyporales.

References 

Fomitopsidaceae
Fungi described in 2013
Fungi of China
Taxa named by Bao-Kai Cui